These are some of the notable events relating to politics in 2009:

Events
United Kingdom Parliamentary expenses scandal

January
January 17 - UN Secretary General Ban Ki-moon calls for an immediate ceasefire during the Gaza conflict.
January 20 - Inauguration of Barack Obama as President of the United States.

June
June 2 - New Politics Party was formed in Thailand.
June 4 - Change 2011 party was formed in Finland.

July
July 3–5 - Global Lincoln, a conference on Abraham Lincoln at St Catherine's College, Oxford.

October
October 1 - The Supreme Court of the United Kingdom begins operating.
October 2 - The Republic of Ireland voted in favour of the Lisbon Treaty.

November
November 3 - Incumbent Democrat Luke Ravenstahl defeats both Franklin Dok Harris and Kevin Acklin in the Pittsburgh mayoral election, 2009.

Deaths
January 1 - Nizar Rayan, Palestinian (born 1959)
January 1 - Helen Suzman, South African (born 1924)
January 15 - Said Seyam, Palestinian (born 1957)
January 25 - Mamadou Dia, Senegalese (born 1910)
January 27 - R. Venkataraman, Indian (born 1910)
February 27 - Manea Manescu, Romanian (born 1916)
March 2 - João Bernardo Vieira, Guinea-Bissauan (born 1939)
March 15 - Ron Silver, American (born 1946)
March 20 - Abdellatif Filali, Moroccan (born 1928)
March 28 - Janet Jagan, Guyanese (born 1920)
March 31 - Raúl Alfonsín, Argentinian (born 1927)
April 15 - Clement Freud, British (born 1924)
April 21 - Jack Jones, British (born 1913)
May 2 - Jack Kemp, American (born 1935)
May 18 - Velupillai Prabhakaran, Sri Lankan (born 1954)
May 23 - Roh Moo-hyun, South Korean (born 1946)
May 30 - Luís Cabral, Guinea-Bissauan (born 1931)
May 30 - Ephraim Katzir, Israeli (born 1916)
May 30 - Gaafar Nimeiri, Sudanese (born 1930)
June 5 - Bernard Barker, American (born 1917)
June 8 - Omar Bongo, Gabonese (born 1935)
June 12 - Félix Malloum, Chadian (born 1932)
June 17 - Ralf Dahrendorf, Anglo-German (born 1929)
June 24 - Roméo LeBlanc, Canadian (born 1927)
July 1 - Alexis Argüello, Nicaraguan (born 1952)
July 2 - Herbert G. Klein, American (born 1918)
July 6 - Robert McNamara, American (born 1916)
July 7 - Reader Harris, British (born 1913)
July 17 - Meir Amit, Israeli (born 1921)
July 26 - James E. King, American (born 1939)
August 1 - Corazon Aquino, Filipina (born 1933)
August 4 - Svend Auken, Danish (born 1943)
August 6 - Savka Dabcevic-Kukar, Croatian (born 1923)
August 11 - Nuala Fennell, Irish (born 1935)
August 18 - Kim Dae-jung, South Korean (born 1925)
August 22 - Adrien Zeller, French (born 1940)
August 25 - Ted Kennedy, American (born 1932)
September 2 - Y. S. Rajasekhara Reddy, Indian (born 1949)
September 28 - Guillermo Endara, Panamanian (born 1936)
October 4 - Shoichi Nakagawa, Japanese (born 1953)
October 16 - Robert William Davis, American (born 1932)
October 17 - Jay W. Johnson, American (born 1943)
October 20 - Clifford Hansen, American (born 1912)
November 4 - William H. Avery, American (born 1911)
November 13 - Bruce King, American (born 1924)
November 15 - Pierre Harmel, Belgian (born 1911)
November 20 - Ghulam Mustafa Jatoi, Pakistani (born 1931)
November 20 - Celso Pitta, Brazilian (born 1946)
November 22 - Ali Kordan, Iranian (born 1958)
December 3 - Paula Hawkins, American (born 1927)
December 5 - Otto Graf Lambsdorff, German (born 1926)
December 9 - Kjell Eugenio Laugerud García, Guatemalan (born 1930)
December 9 - Rodrigo Carazo Odio, Costa Rican (born 1926)
December 16 - Yegor Gaidar, Russian (born 1956)
December 16 - Manto Tshabalala-Msimang (born 1940)
December 17 - Amin al-Hafiz, Syrian (born 1921)

References

 
Politics by year
21st century in politics
2000s in politics